Compsodrillia foruita is an extinct species of sea snail, a marine gastropod mollusk in the family Pseudomelatomidae, the turrids and allies.

Description

Distribution
Fossils have been found in the Shimajiri Formation of Okinawa

References

 Okinawa Prefectural Museum & Art Museum : holotype

External links
  F. Stearns MacNeil, Tertiary and Quaternary Gastropoda of Okinawa, Geological Survey Professional Paper, United States Government Printing Office, Washington 1960

foruita
Gastropods described in 1960